HMS Alert a  of the Royal Navy. She was originally laid down as the  vessel Loch Scamdale, and re-ordered as Dundrum Bay while building. She was completed as Alert, an Admiralty Yacht for command and gunboat diplomacy duties in the Mediterranean and Far Eastern stations.

Alert was sold to be broken up for scrap in October 1971.

Service history
Alert was commissioned for service on 24 October 1946, and arrived at Singapore, her home port, on 29 November, to join the British Pacific Fleet. She spent the next 18 years carrying out an extensive series of visits to ports in China, Japan, Malaya, Vietnam, Borneo, and the Philippines, as well as being deployed operationally as a frigate in support of anti-insurgent operations during the Malayan Emergency, and taking part in various joint and multi-national fleet exercises.

In late 1951 Alert was temporarily deployed with United Nations Task Group to carry out naval fire support operations off the west coast of Korea.

In October 1952 she sailed to the north-west coast of Western Australia to take part in "Operation Hurricane", the first British atom bomb test. Later, in April 1957 she sailed to Christmas Island as part of "Operation Grapple", Britain's first thermonuclear bomb tests.

Between 1954 and 1956 she was commanded by Lieutenant Commander David Dunbar-Nasmith.

In 1958 she visited Japan, attending celebrations marking of 338th anniversary of the foundation of the Japanese Navy by William Adams, the English sailor who, after being shipwrecked in Japan, was credited with introducing western principles of shipbuilding.

In December 1962 Alert was deployed operationally as HQ ship at Brunei after the start of the Indonesia–Malaysia confrontation (Konfrontasi). Troops and supplies were embarked to support the military operations. The ship also provided a communications link and was occasionally deployed with other ships of the 3rd Frigate Squadron for patrol duty off Borneo.

Alert finally returned to the UK, arriving at Plymouth on 18 May 1964, and was laid up in the Reserve Fleet. In 1971 she was placed on the Disposal List, sold to BISCO for demolition by Thos. W. Ward at Inverkeithing, and was towed to the breaker's yard in October.

References

Publications
 
 H.M.S. Alert 1963–1964. Commissioning Book (1964). No publisher, No ISBN number.

 

Bay-class frigates
1945 ships
Korean War frigates of the United Kingdom
Ships built on the River Blyth